The Çengelhan Rahmi M. Koç Museum is a technology museum in Ankara, Turkey.

Geography
The museum is in the old quarters of Ankara known as historic Atpazarı (literally: Horse market), facing the Ankara Citadel. It is at an altitude of  slightly higher than the rest of the city.

History
The museum is situated in a historic inn, called Çengelhan (literally: Hooks inn). According to an inscription on the main gate, the inn was built in 1523 during the reign of Ottoman Sultan Suleyman I. Later, it was used as a warehouse for mohair, which was a speciality of Ankara. During the Republican era, it was owned by the General Directorate of Foundations of Turkey. In 2003, it was rented to industrialist, Rahmi M. Koç, to be used as a museum. After a restoration period, it was opened in 2005.

The museum
The lower floor is reserved for a carpet gallery, agricultural machinery and pharmaceutical exhibits. Machines, medicine, everyday life tools and road transport vehicles are exhibited on the ground floor, along with a brasserie (café). The upper floor contains exhibits of rail transport items, toys, and instruments for communications, science, maritime and navigation. There are also sections about Mustafa Kemal Atatürk, the founder of modern Turkey; Vehbi Koç, Rahmi Koç's father and one of the first industrialists of Turkey, and Ankara city.

Gallery

References 

Museums in Altındağ, Ankara
Transport museums in Turkey
Museums established in 2005
Redevelopment projects in Turkey
Technology museums in Turkey
Koç family
2005 establishments in Turkey